In hyperbolic geometry, a hypercycle, hypercircle or equidistant curve is a curve whose points have the same orthogonal distance from a given straight line (its axis).

The line  is called the axis, center, or base line of the hypercycle. Their common length is called the distance or radius of the hypercycle.

The hypercycles through a given point that share a tangent through that point converge towards a horocycle as their distances go towards infinity.

Properties similar to those of Euclidean lines 
Hypercycles in hyperbolic geometry have some properties similar to those of lines in Euclidean geometry:

 In a plane, given a line and a point not on it, there is only one hypercycle of that of the given line (compare with Playfair's axiom for Euclidean geometry).
 No three points of a hypercycle are on a circle.
 A hypercycle is symmetrical to each line perpendicular to it. (Reflecting a hypercycle in a line perpendicular to the hypercycle results in the same hypercycle.)

Properties similar to those of Euclidean circles 

Hypercycles in hyperbolic geometry have some properties similar to those of circles in Euclidean geometry:
 A line perpendicular to a chord of a hypercycle at its midpoint is a radius and it bisects the arc subtended by the chord.
 Let AB be the chord and M its middle point.
 By symmetry the line R through M perpendicular to AB must be orthogonal to the axis L.
 Therefore R is a radius.
 Also by symmetry, R will bisect the arc AB.
 The axis and distance of a hypercycle are uniquely determined.
 Let us assume that a hypercycle C has two different axes L1 and L2.
 Using the previous property twice with different chords we can determine two distinct radii R1 and R2. R1 and R2 will then have to be perpendicular to both L1 and L2, giving us a rectangle. This is a contradiction because the rectangle is an impossible figure in hyperbolic geometry.
 Two hypercycles have equal distances if and only if they are congruent.
 If they have equal distance, we just need to bring the axes to coincide by a rigid motion and also all the radii will coincide; since the distance is the same, also the points of the two hypercycles will coincide.
 Vice versa, if they are congruent the distance must be the same by the previous property.
 A straight line cuts a hypercycle in at most two points.
 Let the line K cut the hypercycle C in two points A and B. As before, we can construct the radius R of C through the middle point M of AB. Note that K is ultraparallel to the axis L because they have the common perpendicular R. Also, two ultraparallel lines have minimum distance at the common perpendicular and monotonically increasing distances as we go away from the perpendicular.
 This means that the points of K inside AB will have distance from L smaller than the common distance of A and B from L, while the points of K outside AB will have greater distance. In conclusion, no other point of K can be on C.
 Two hypercycles intersect in at most two points.
 Let C1 and C2 be hypercycles intersecting in three points A, B, and C.
 If R1 is the line orthogonal to AB through its middle point, we know that it is a radius of both C1 and C2.
 Similarly we construct R2, the radius through the middle point of BC.
 R1 and R2 are simultaneously orthogonal to the axes L1 and L2 of C1 and C2, respectively.
 We already proved that then L1 and L2 must coincide (otherwise we have a rectangle).
 Then C1 and C2 have the same axis and at least one common point, therefore they have the same distance and they coincide.
 No three points of a hypercycle are collinear.
 If the points A, B, and C of a hypercycle are collinear then the chords AB and BC are on the same line K.  Let R1 and R2 be the radii through the middle points of AB and BC.  We know that the axis L of the hypercycle is the common perpendicular of R1 and R2.
 But K is that common perpendicular.  Then the distance must be 0 and the hypercycle degenerates into a line.

Other properties 

 The length of an arc of a hypercycle between two points is
 longer than the length of the line segment between those two points, 
 shorter than the length of the arc of one of the two horocycles between those two points, and
 shorter than any circle arc between those two points.
 A hypercycle and a horocycle intersect in at most two points.
A hypercycle of radius r with (2r) = 1 induces a quasi-symmetry of the hyperbolic plane by inversion. (Such a hypercycle meets its axis at an angle of π/4.) Specifically, a point P in an open half-plane of the axis inverts to P′ whose angle of parallelism is the complement of that of P. This quasi-symmetry generalizes to hyperbolic spaces of higher dimension where it facilitates the study of hyperbolic manifolds. It is used extensively in the classification of conics in the hyperbolic plane where it has been called split inversion. Though conformal, split inversion is not a true symmetry since it interchanges the axis with the boundary of the plane and, of course, is not an isometry.

Length of an arc 

In the hyperbolic plane of constant curvature −1, the length of an arc of a hypercycle can be calculated from the radius r and the distance between the points where the normals intersect with the axis d using the formula .

Construction 

In the Poincaré disk model of the hyperbolic plane, hypercycles are represented by lines and circle arcs that intersect the boundary circle at non-right angles. The representation of the axis intersects the boundary circle in the same points, but at right angles.

In the Poincaré half-plane model of the hyperbolic plane, hypercycles are represented by lines and circle arcs that intersect the boundary line at non-right angles. The representation of the axis intersects the boundary line in the same points, but at right angles.

Congruence classes of Steiner parabolas 
The congruence classes of Steiner parabolas in the hyperbolic plane are in one-to-one correspondence with the hypercycles in a given half-plane H of a given axis. In an incidence geometry, the Steiner conic at a point P  produced by a collineation T is the locus of intersections L  T(L) for all lines L through P. This is the analogue of Steiner's definition of a conic in the projective plane over a field. The congruence classes of Steiner conics in the hyperbolic plane are determined by the distance  between P and T(P) and the angle of rotation  induced by T about T(P). Each Steiner parabola is the locus of points whose distance from a focus F is equal to the distance to a hypercycle directrix that is not a line. Fixing , the classes of parabolas are in one-to-one correspondence with  ∈ (0,π/2). In the conformal disk model, each point P is a complex number with |P|  Let the common axis be the real line and assume the hypercycles are in the half-plane H with 

Im(P) . Then the vertex of each parabola will be in H, and the parabola is symmetric about the line through the vertex perpendicular to the axis. In particular, F = 0 when  π/4. In this case, the focus is on the axis; equivalently, inversion in the corresponding hypercycle leaves H invariant. This is the harmonic case, that is, the representation of the parabola in any inversive model of the hyperbolic plane is a harmonic, genus 1 curve.

References

 Martin Gardner, Non-Euclidean Geometry, Chapter 4 of The Colossal Book of Mathematics, W. W. Norton & Company, 2001, 
 M. J. Greenberg, Euclidean and Non-Euclidean Geometries: Development and History, 3rd edition, W. H. Freeman, 1994.
 George E. Martin, The Foundations of Geometry and the Non-Euclidean Plane, Springer-Verlag, 1975.
J. G. Ratcliffe, Foundation of Hyperbolic Manifolds, Springer, New York, 1994.
 David C. Royster, Neutral and Non-Euclidean Geometries.
J. Sarli, Conics in the hyperbolic plane intrinsic to the collineation group, J. Geom. 103: 131-138 (2012)

Hyperbolic geometry
Curves